The 1969 Nobel Prize in Literature was awarded to the Irish author Samuel Beckett (1906–1989) "for his writing, which - in new forms for the novel and drama - in the destitution of modern man acquires its elevation."

Laureate

Samuel Beckett produced his most important works – four novels, two dramas, a collection of short stories, essays, and art criticism – during an intensely creative period in the late 1940s. He had settled in France and wrote in both French and English. His experiences during World War II – insecurity, confusion, exile, hunger, deprivation – came to shape his writing. In his most famous work, the drama En attendant Godot (Waiting for Godot, 1952), he examines the most basic foundations of our lives with strikingly dark humor. Among his other famous literary works include Krapp's Last Tape (1958), Happy Days (1961) and The Molloy Trilogy (1955–58).

Deliberations

Nominations
In total, the Swedish Academy received 184 nominations for 103 individuals. Samuel Beckett was nominated in 26 occasions since 1957, and received 5 nominations for the 1969 prize with which he was awarded afterwards.

Nominees included were André Malraux, Simone de Beauvoir, Jorge Luis Borges, Pablo Neruda (awarded in 1971), Heinrich Böll (awarded in 1972), Eugenio Montale (awarded in 1975), Günter Grass (awarded in 1999), Jorge Amado, Louis Aragon, Witold Gombrowicz, Vladimir Nabokov, Alberto Moravia, Robert Graves, W. H. Auden and Graham Greene. 30 of the nominees were nominated first-time, among them Aimé Césaire, Aleksandr Solzhenitsyn (awarded in 1970), Arthur Miller, Jacques Maritain, Tawfiq al-Hakim, Edward Albee, Yasushi Inoue and Elias Canetti (awarded in 1981). The nominees who were with the highest number of nominations received – 8 nominations each – were André Malraux, Giuseppe Ungaretti and Tarjei Vesaas. The oldest nominee was Belgian writer Stijn Streuvels (aged 98) and the youngest were Ivan Drach and Hannu Salama (both aged 33 at the time). Five of the nominees were women: Anna Seghers, Nathalie Sarraute, Simone de Beauvoir, Marie Under and Elisaveta Bagryana. The 1951 Nobel laureate Swedish author Pär Lagerkvist nominated his countrymen and colleagues in the Swedish Academy, authors Eyvind Johnson and Harry Martinson who would share the prize in 1974.

The authors Alejandro G. Abadilla, Giovanni Comisso, Ivy Compton-Burnett, Richmal Crompton, Harry Emerson Fosdick, Emilio Frugoni, Jack Kerouac, Eugenia Kielland, Norman Lindsay, Erika Mann, Elizaveta Polonskaya, Phraya Anuman Rajadhon, Zoila Ugarte de Landivar, and John Wyndham died in 1969 without having been nominated the prize. The Polish playwright Witold Gombrowicz and Belgian writer Stijn Streuvels died months before the announcement.

Prize decision
The decision to award Samuel Beckett was controversial within the Swedish Academy. While some members of the Nobel committee was enthusiastic about the idea of awarding Beckett, the Nobel committee chairman Anders Österling had serious doubts that Beckett's writing was in the spirit of Alfred Nobel's will. In 1964 he had argued that he “would almost consider a Nobel prize for him as an absurdity in his own style”. Beckett was a leading candidate for the 1968 prize along with André Malraux, W.H. Auden and the Japanese writer Yasunari Kawabata, but was rejected in favour of Kawabata.

The Nobel committee, which in 1969 consisted of Anders Österling, Karl Ragnar Gierow, Lars Gyllensten, Eyvind Johnson, Artur Lundkvist and Henry Olsson, disagreed on the candidates to the extent that no jointly proposal could be presented to the Swedish Academy. Österling proposed André Malraux, with Graham Greene as his second proposal and Giuseppe Ungaretti (possibly shared with Eugenio Montale) as the third proposal. Johnson also proposed André Malraux, with Claude Simon as his second proposal and Patrick White as the third proposal. Gierow, Gyllensten, Lundkvist and Olsson jointly proposed Samuel Beckett, with Lundkvist adding the proposals Patrick White and Claude Simon. In his report Lundkvist opposed the candidacy of André Malraux, arguing that his major works was too far back in time and had lost some of its relevance. Lundkvist also regretted that the candidacies of the négritude-authors Aimé Césaire and Léopold Sédar Senghor had not been taken in consideration by the Nobel committee and recommended them for future consideration.       

Despite Österling's reservations Beckett was awarded in 1969. The Nobel committee had received five nominations for Beckett that year, but was split as Österling and one other member supported a prize to André Malraux. Other nominations that year included Simone de Beauvoir, Jorge Luis Borges, Pablo Neruda and Graham Greene. While Österling acknowledged the possibility that behind Beckett's “depressing motives” might lie a “secret defence of humanity”, he argued that in the eyes of most readers it “remains an artistically staged ghost poetry, characterised by a bottomless contempt for the human condition”. Beckett's main supporter on the committee, Karl Ragnar Gierow, on the other hand, argued that Beckett's “black vision” was “not the expression of animosity and nihilism” but “portrays humanity as we have all seen it, at the moment of its most severe violation”, and searches for the depths of degradation because even there, “there is the possibility of rehabilitation”. Beckett was awarded and in his award ceremony speech Gierow expanded on his arguments, saying Beckett's work goes “to the depths” because “it is only there that pessimistic thought and poetry can work their miracles".

Reactions
While not rejecting the prize, Beckett did not attend the prize ceremony, nor did he deliver a Nobel lecture. His wife described his reaction to the news that he had been awarded the Nobel Prize in Literature as a "catastrophe". He quickly donated the prize money, much of it to Trinity College Dublin.

References

External links
Ceremony speech by Karl Ragnar Gierow nobelprize.org

1969
Samuel Beckett